Bar Mountain is a mountain in the Tweed Range in the Northern Rivers region of New South Wales, Australia.

References

Mountains of New South Wales
Northern Rivers